Sanctuary is the fifth extended play (EP) by South Korean girl group Lovelyz. The album was released on November 26, 2018 by Woollim Entertainment and distributed by Kakao M. The album contains seven tracks, including the lead single "Lost N Found".

Background and release
On October 30, Woollim Entertainment announced that Lovelyz would make a comeback on November 26. Promotion for the album began with the release of individual teasers of members and the short version of music video teaser through the group's official accounts on Twitter, Facebook, and YouTube from November 15 to November 20. Through these teasers, the name of the album was unveiled, titled Sanctuary. The title track "Lost N Found" was revealed with the release of the album's tracklist on November 21. The next day, Lovelyz released a longer version of the music video teaser for "Lost N Found". Their EP officially released online and physically on November 26.

Promotions
Lovelyz held their comeback showcase at Yes24 Live Hall on November 26, 2018, the same day as the album's release.

Track listing

Charts

References

2018 EPs
Lovelyz albums
Woollim Entertainment EPs
Korean-language EPs
Kakao M EPs